Pheidole megacephala is a species of ant in the family Formicidae. It is commonly known as the big-headed ant in the USA and the coastal brown ant in Australia. It is a very successful invasive species and is considered a danger to native ants in Australia and other places. It is regarded as one of the world's worst invasive ant species.

Distribution
Pheidole megacephala was described from a specimen from the island of Mauritius by the entomologist Johan Christian Fabricius in 1793, although a 1775 record exists for Egypt, under the name Formica edax. Regardless of its origin, big-headed ants have since spread to many tropical and subtropical parts of the world.

Description

There are two types of worker ants, the major or soldier ant and the minor worker. The common name of bigheaded ant derives from the soldier's disproportionately large head. This has large mandibles which may be used to crush seeds. The soldiers are about four millimetres in length, twice as long as the minor workers. The colour of both types varies from yellowish-brown or reddish-brown to nearly black.

The rear half of the head is smooth and glossy and the front half sculptured. The twelve-segmented antennae are curved and have club-like tips. The waist or petiole is two-segmented with the node immediately behind conspicuously swollen. There are a pair of short, upward-facing spines on the waist. The body has sparse, long hairs.

Colonies and reproduction

Bigheaded ants nest in colonies underground. Colonies can have several queens  and supercolonies can be formed by budding, when a queen and workers leave the original nest and set up a new colony nearby without swarming. In Florida, nuptial flights of winged ants take place during the winter and spring and afterwards, fertilized queens shed their wings and find a suitable site to found a new colony where they start laying eggs. Each queen lays up to 290 eggs per month. The eggs hatch after two to four weeks and the legless white larvae, which are fed by the workers, pupate about a month later. The adult workers emerge ten to twenty days after that.

The minor workers are much more numerous than the soldiers. Trails of ants lead up trunks, along branches and into the canopies of trees and debris-covered foraging tunnels with numerous entrances are created on the surface of the ground. These may be confused with similar tubes built by subterranean termites.

P. megacephala can also live indoors.

Nutrition 

The bigheaded ants feed on dead insects, small invertebrates and honeydew excreted by insects such as aphids, soft scale insects, mealybugs, whiteflies and planthoppers. These sap-sucking bugs thrive in the presence of bigheaded ants, being more abundant on plants patrolled by ants than on those not so patrolled. Also, bigheaded ants are predators of the eggs of various species of moths such as the African sugarcane borer, common in sub-Saharan Africa. Green scale, Coccus viridis, flourished when bigheaded ants protected their food source by removing predators such as lady beetle larvae and lepidopteran larvae.

Foraging ants will alert others to new food sources. Honeydew is ingested but other foodstuffs are carried back to the nest by both major and minor workers who may transfer items of food between themselves. Anything too big to be moved may be dissected before being brought back to the nest.

Harmfulness 
Bigheaded ants are a threat to biodiversity through the displacement of native invertebrate fauna and is a pest of agriculture through harvesting seeds and harbouring insects on crops. They are also known to chew on irrigation and telephone cabling as well as electrical wires.

References

External links
 
 Pheidole megacephala FAQ (Frequently Asked Questions)

megacephala
Insects described in 1793
Hymenoptera of New Zealand
Ants of New Zealand